Lascoria alucitalis is a species of litter moth of the family Erebidae. It is found from Central America to the Guyanas, Cuba, Puerto Rico and Jamaica. It is also found in Florida.

External links
Images
Moths of Jamaica

Herminiinae
Moths described in 1854